Handeliodendron bodinieri is a rare deciduous tree/shrub native to China and the only species in the monotypic genus Handeliodendron.

Description 
It grows up to 15 meters tall, and grows in mountain areas characterized by irregular limestone formations in Guangxi and Guizhou.  The seeds are rich in oil, making them attractive to wild animals.

Classification 
It is related to Aesculus (horse chestnuts) and Billia, and is classified with in either Sapindaceae, subfamily Hippocastanoideae, or the family Hippocastanaceae.

References 

Monotypic Sapindaceae genera
Flora of China
Sapindaceae